Zephyr or zephyr cloth is a sheer, lightweight cotton fabric, usually plain woven, used for dresses, blouses, and shirts. It may be striped or checked.  It is named after Zephyr, the Greek god of the west wind.

References 

Woven fabrics